Nikoloz Basilashvili defeated Jan-Lennard Struff in the final, 6–4, 7–6(7–5) to win the men's singles tennis title at the 2021 Bavarian International Tennis Championships. After not dropping a set en route to his victory, Basilashvili earned his second title of the season and his fifth career ATP Tour singles title overall. Struff was in contention to win his first title in his first tour-level final.

Cristian Garín was the defending champion from when the tournament was last held in 2019, but he competed at the simultaneous Estoril Open instead.

Seeds
The top four seeds received a bye into the second round.

Draw

Finals

Top half

Bottom half

Qualifying

Seeds

Qualifiers

Lucky losers

Qualifying draw

First qualifier

Second qualifier

Third qualifier

Fourth qualifier

References

External links 
 Main draw
 Qualifying draw

Singles